Paddy O'Rourke (born 10 May 1989) is an Irish Gaelic footballer who plays as a goalkeeper for his club Skryne and, formerly, the Meath county team. O'Rourke is the nephew of former Skryne and Meath player Colm and first cousin of former Meath player Shane.

Playing career

Club
He played for the Skryne juvenile team at a young age and eventually became the Skryne senior team's first choice goalkeeper, aged 16. He subsequently moved outfield to a forward position. O'Rourke was top scorer on the 2010 SFC Skryne winning team.

An outfield player at club level, O'Rourke has also played club football in Australia.

Inter-county
O'Rourke played for the Meath U21 football team up until 2010. He made his debut for the Meath senior team starting as a goalkeeper in a Leinster Quarter-finals game against Dublin on 7 June 2009. In 2010 O'Rourke was the starting goalkeeper for Meath, but was replaced by Trim's Brendan Murphy during the re-played Leinster Senior Football Championship game against Laois. O'Rourke played as a forward briefly for his county until 2013 when David Gallagher retired.

He then abruptly retired, bemoaning his lack of silverware with Meath: 

Within two years Meath had qualified for the Super 8.

International rules
He played twice as goalkeeper for Ireland against Australia in the 2013 International Rules Series. He again played in goals for Ireland in the November 2014 International Rules Match played in Perth, Australia

Honours
Meath
 Leinster Senior Football Championship: 2010

Ireland
 International Rules Series: 2013

References

1989 births
Living people
Gaelic football goalkeepers
Irish expatriate sportspeople in Australia
Irish international rules football players
Meath inter-county Gaelic footballers
Skryne Gaelic footballers